The National Marine Life Center is an independent, non-profit marine animal hospital, science, and education center based in Bourne, Massachusetts. Their mission is to rehabilitate for release stranded sea turtles, seals, dolphins, porpoises, and small whales, and to advance scientific knowledge and education in marine wildlife and conservation.

External links 
National Marine Life Center

Non-profit organizations based in Massachusetts
Bourne, Massachusetts
Tourist attractions in Barnstable County, Massachusetts
Marine mammal rehabilitation and conservation centers